
Gmina Gródek is a rural gmina (administrative district) in Białystok County, Podlaskie Voivodeship, in north-eastern Poland, on the border with Belarus.

The gmina contains part of the protected area called Knyszyń Forest Landscape Park.

Villages
Gmina Gródek contains the villages and settlements of Bagno, Bielewicze, Bobrowniki, Borki, Chomontowce, Downiewo, Dzierniakowo, Glejsk, Gobiaty, Gródek, Gródek-Kolonia, Grzybowce, Jakubin, Jaryłówka, Józefowo, Kołodno, Kondycja, Kozi Las, Królowe Stojło, Królowy Most, Kuberka, Łużany, Mieleszki, Mieleszki-Kolonia, Mostowlany, Narejki, Nowosiółki, Pałatki, Pieszczaniki, Piłatowszczyzna, Podozierany, Podzałuki, Przechody, Radunin, Ruda, Skroblaki, Słuczanka, Sofipol, Straszewo, Stryjenszczyzna, Świsłoczany, Waliły, Waliły-Dwór, Waliły-Stacja, Wiejki, Wierobie, Wyżary, Załuki, Zarzeczany, Zasady, Zielona, Zubki and Zubry.

Neighbouring gminas
Gmina Gródek is bordered by the gminas of Krynki, Michałowo, Supraśl, Szudziałowo and Zabłudów. It also borders Belarus.

Born
 Kastuś Kalinoŭski (1838–1864) - a writer, journalist, lawyer, one of the leaders of Belarusian and Lithuanian national revival (was born in Mostowlany).
 Aliaksei Karpiuk (1920–1992) - Belarusian writer and public activist (was born in Straszewo).
 Leon Tarasewicz - Polish artist of Belarusian origin (was born in Waliły)

Culture
Basovišča (Music Festival of Young Belarus) – the festival of Belarusian alternative and rock music, which is annually conducted by Belarusian Association of Students since 1990.

References
 Polish official population figures 2006

Grodek
Białystok County